COD Meknes, also called Club Omnisports De Meknès is a Moroccan football club based in Meknes. The club came into being when four local teams; Rachad Meknassi, ASTF, Atlas and Alismailia merged on 21 June 1962. Upon formation CODM Meknès created teams in water polo, basketball, volleyball, handball and most notably football.

CODM coach
Beniessa Ayyadi, he used to teach many sports in Meknes such as football, basketball, tennis and some boxing. He was the first African to carry the Olympic torch.

Beneissa Goubi Ayyadi (1924–04)

Honours
Moroccan League First Division: 1
Champion : 1995

Coupe du Trône: 1
Champion : 1966
Runner-up : 1981, 2011

Performance in CAF competitions
CAF Confederation Cup: 2 appearances
2005 – First Round
2012 – Play-off Round

Managers
 Aziz Al-Khayati
 Raoul Savoy (2003–05)
 Eugen Moldovan (2006–07)
 Abderrahim Talib (2012)
 Youssef Lemrini (Nov 2012 – 13 Jan)
 Hicham El Idrissi (Jan 2013 – 13 Feb)
 Abdelaziz Kerkache (Feb 2013–)

Former players
Abdelilah Sghir
Abdellah Belbakri
Abdelaziz El Amri
Abdelwahed Benhsain
Mustapha El Khalfi
Mustapha Bidane
Mohamed Hcina
Lahcen Seggari
Jamal Drideb
Kamal Dalil
  Abdeljalil Hadda
Mohamed Yousfi
Kamal Assou
Abdellah Bodouma
  ''Carlos Gomes (footballer, born 1932)

Former presidents
Mohamed Lamrabet
Ba Hamid Sidi Lahlou
Idriss El-Alami
Saleh Rhalaf
Haj Mohamed Benabdeljalil
Haj Salam Bennouna
Abdelnabi Terrab
Kamal El-Mandri
Moulay Abdelrahman El-Bachiri
Mustapha El-Baz
Nourredine Kendouci
Idriss El-Alami
Abdelaziz Rehioui
Idriss El-Alami
Mohamed Saâdallah
Hassan El-Mahmoudi
Haj Mohamed Keddari
Mohamed Saâdallah

Sport equipment
 Adidas

References

 
Football clubs in Morocco
1962 establishments in Morocco
Sports clubs in Morocco
Sport in Meknes